Stephen Henry Schneider (February 11, 1945 – July 19, 2010) was Professor of Environmental Biology and Global Change at Stanford University, a Co-Director at the Center for Environment Science and Policy of the Freeman Spogli Institute for International Studies and a Senior Fellow in the Stanford Woods Institute for the Environment. Schneider served as a consultant to federal agencies and White House staff in the Richard Nixon, Jimmy Carter, Ronald Reagan, George H. W. Bush, Bill Clinton, George W. Bush and Barack Obama administrations.

Schneider's research included modeling of the atmosphere, climate change, and the effect of global climate change on biological systems. Schneider was the founder and editor of the journal Climatic Change and authored or co-authored over 450 scientific papers and other publications. He was a Coordinating Lead Author in Working Group II Intergovernmental Panel on Climate Change (IPCC) Third Assessment Report and was engaged as a co-anchor of the Key Vulnerabilities Cross-Cutting Theme for the Fourth Assessment Report (AR4) at the time of his death. During the 1980s, Schneider emerged as a leading public advocate of sharp reductions of greenhouse gas emissions to combat global warming. In 2006 Professor Schneider was an Adelaide Thinker in Residence advising the South Australian Government of Premier Mike Rann on climate change and renewable energy policies. In ten years South Australia went from zero to 31% of its electricity generation coming from renewables.

An annual award for outstanding climate science communication was created in Schneider's honor after his death, by the Commonwealth Club of California. The Stephen Schneider Memorial Lecture of the American Geophysical Union honors Schneider's life and work.

Early work
Schneider grew up on Long Island, New York. He studied engineering at Columbia University, receiving his bachelor's degree in mechanical engineering in 1966. In 1971, he earned a Ph.D. in mechanical engineering and plasma physics. Schneider studied the role of greenhouse gases and suspended particulate material on climate as a postdoctoral fellow at NASA's Goddard Institute for Space Studies. Schneider was awarded the Marshall Scholarship.

In 1971, Schneider was second author on a Science paper with S. Ichtiaque Rasool titled "Atmospheric Carbon Dioxide and Aerosols: Effects of Large Increases on Global Climate" (Science 173, 138–141). This paper used a one-dimensional radiative transfer model to examine the competing effects of cooling from aerosols and warming from CO2. The paper concluded that:

Carbon dioxide was predicted to have only a minor role. However, the model was very simple and the calculation of the CO2 effect was lower than other estimates by a factor of about three, as noted in a footnote to the paper.

The story made headlines in The New York Times. Shortly afterwards, Schneider became aware that he had overestimated the cooling effect of aerosols, and underestimated the warming effect of CO2 by a factor of about three. He had mistakenly assumed that measurements of air particles he had taken near the source of pollution applied worldwide. He also found that much of the effect was due to natural aerosols which would not be affected by human activities, so the cooling effect of changes in industrial pollution would be much less than he had calculated. Having found that recalculation showed that global warming was the more likely outcome, he published a retraction of his earlier findings in 1974.

In a 1976 book The Genesis Strategy he discusses both long-term warming due to carbon dioxide and short-term cooling due to aerosols, and advocated for adopting policies that are resilient to future changes in climate.

Media contributions
Schneider was a frequent contributor to commercial and noncommercial print and broadcast media on climate and environmental issues, e.g., Nova, Planet Earth, Nightline, Today Show, The Tonight Show, Bill Maher's shows, Good Morning America, Dateline, The Discovery Channel, as well as appearances on the British, Canadian and Australian Broadcasting Corporations.

Schneider commented about the frustrations and difficulties involved with assessing and communicating scientific ideas. In a January 2002 Scientific American article, he wrote:

In 1989, Schneider addressed the challenge scientists face trying to communicate complex, important issues without adequate time during media interviews. This citation sometimes was used by his critics to accuse him of supporting misuse of science for political goals:

For the original, together with Schneider's commentary on its misrepresentation, see also American Physical Society, APS News August/September 1996.

Honors

 1991 AAAS Award for Public Understanding of Science and Technology.
 1992 MacArthur Fellow "Genius Award".
 2002 Elected to the National Academy of Sciences.
 Chair of the American Association for the Advancement of Science's Section on Atmospheric and Hydrospheric Sciences (1999–2001).
 The Intergovernmental Panel on Climate Change (IPCC), to which Schneider made very significant contributions, shared in the 2007 Nobel Peace Prize.

Personal
Schneider was married to the biologist Terry Root. Schneider was a survivor of an aggressive cancer, mantle cell lymphoma. He documented his struggle to conquer the condition, including applying his own knowledge of science to design his own treatment regime, in a self-published 2005 book, The Patient from Hell.

Selected publications

Stephen H. Schneider, Tim Flannery introduction (2009) Science as a Contact Sport: Inside the Battle to Save the Earth's Climate. National Geographic Society (November 3, 2009) 
Stephen H. Schneider, James R. Miller, Eileen Crist and Penelope J. Boston (Eds, 2008). Scientists debate Gaia: the next century.  Cambridge: The MIT Press. 
Stephen H. Schneider, Janica Lane (2005) The Patient from Hell: How I Worked with My Doctors to Get the Best of Modern Medicine and How You Can Too. Da Capo Lifelong Books.
 Stephen H. Schneider, Armin Rosencranz, John O. Niles (eds., 2002), Climate Change Policy: A Survey, Island Press, 368 pp; June 2002.
 Stephen H. Schneider and Terry L. Root (Editors, 2001), Wildlife Responses to Climate Change: North American Case Studies, Island Press; December 2001.
 Stephen H. Schneider (1997), Laboratory Earth: the Planetary Gamble We Can't Afford to Lose, HarperCollins; January 1997
 Stephen H. Schneider (Editor, 1996), Encyclopedia of Climate and Weather, Oxford University Press; May 1996.
 Stephen H. Schneider, Penelope J. Boston (Eds, 1992), Scientists on Gaia, MIT Press; February 1992
 Stephen H. Schneider (1989), Global Warming: Are We Entering the Greenhouse Century?, Sierra Club Books; October 1989
 Stephen H. Schneider, Randi Londer (1984), Coevolution of Climate and Life, Sierra Club Books; May 1984
 Stephen H. Schneider, Lynne E. Mesirow (1976), The Genesis Strategy: Climate and Global Survival, Plenum Pub Corp; April 1976.

See also
Point Paterson Desalination Plant
Politics of global warming

References

Further reading

 Santer, B. and Ehrlich, P. 2014. Stephen Schneider: a biographical essay. Washington D.C.: National Academy of Sciences.

External links
 
 Biography of Dr. Schneider (stanford.edu)
 Dr. Schneider's 1997 testimony to the U.S. Senate is no longer available on the U.S. Senate web site, but is available on the 
 Exchange between Schneider and Richard Lindzen is no longer available on the Cato Institute web site, but is available on the 
 New York Times announcing his death
  a presentation made at Stanford University in February 2010.
  by Climate One
  Schneider talked to a sceptical audience, recorded by SBS Australia in June 2010. He died a few weeks later.

American atmospheric scientists
American climatologists
Intergovernmental Panel on Climate Change lead authors
Sustainability advocates
Stanford University Department of Biology faculty
Stanford University School of Engineering faculty
MacArthur Fellows
Members of the United States National Academy of Sciences
Columbia School of Engineering and Applied Science alumni
People from Long Island
1945 births
2010 deaths